30 Girls 6 Concepts is an EP by contestants of the South Korean survival show Produce 48. It was released digitally on August 18, 2018 by Stone Music Entertainment.

Background
Produce 48 was a South Korean survival show that aired on Mnet from June 15, 2018, to August 31, where 96 female trainees from various entertainment companies competed to debut in a 12-member girl group which would promote for two and a half years under Stone Music Entertainment.

Commercial performance 
All six songs from the EP entered the Gaon Digital Chart on the week ending August 25: "Rumor" at number 24, "To Reach You" at 57, "Rollin' Rollin'" at 66, "1000%" at 70, "See You Again" at 80 and "I Am" at 92. All the songs also entered the Kpop Hot 100 on the week ending August 26. In its second week, three songs remained on the Digital Chart:  "Rumor" placed at number 57, "To Reach You" at 85, "Rollin' Rollin'" at 95. Also four songs remained on the Hot 100: "Rumor" placed at number 58, "To Reach You" at 81, "Rollin' Rollin'" at 91 and "1000%" at 98. In its third week, "Rumor" placed at number 66 on the Digital Chart and at 68 on the Hot 100, meanwhile "To Reach You" at 97 on the lattest. In its fourth week, "Rumor" placed at number 80 on the Digital Chart and at 77 on the Hot 100. In a fifth week, "Rumor" placed at number 99 on the Digital Chart and at 94 on the Hot 100.

"Rumor" was the 83rd best-selling song of August 2018.

Track listing

Charts

Songs

References

K-pop albums
Korean-language compilation albums
Produce 101
2018 compilation albums